Philip Nzeyimana Oslev (born 27 November 1994) is a professional footballer who plays as a rightback for AB. Born in Denmark, he represents the Burundi national team.

International career
Oslev was born in Denmark and is of Burundian descent through his father. He debuted for the Burundi national team in a friendly 1–0 win over Tanzania on 11 October 2020.

References

External links
 
 NFT Profile

1994 births
Living people
Burundian footballers
Burundi international footballers
Danish men's footballers
Burundian people of Danish descent
Danish people of Burundian descent
Association football fullbacks
Skovshoved IF players
Akademisk Boldklub players
People from Fredericia
Sportspeople from the Region of Southern Denmark